Hedley was a railway station on the South Gippsland line in South Gippsland, Victoria. The station was opened during the 1890s, and operated until its closure on 31 July 1976.

References

Disused railway stations in Victoria (Australia)
Transport in Gippsland (region)
Shire of Wellington